The Last Road is a 1986 Soviet drama film directed by Leonid Menaker.

Plot 
The film tells about the last days of the great Russian poet Alexander Pushkin. The film tries to answer the questions: Who is to blame for the death of Pushkin and for what did he fight in a duel?

Cast 
 Aleksandr Kalyagin as Zhukovskiy
 Vadim Medvedev as Vyazemskiy
 Irina Kupchenko as Vyazemskaya
 Yelena Karadzhova as Natalya Pushkina
 Innokentiy Smoktunovskiy as Baron Geckern
 Gediminas Storpirstis as Dantes
 Andrey Myagkov as Dubelt
 Anna Kamenkova as Alexandra
 Sergey Sazontev as Danzas
 Vyacheslav Yezepov as Turgenev

References

External links 
 

1986 films
Films directed by Leonid Menaker
1980s Russian-language films
Soviet drama films
1986 drama films